Willard Otis Wylie (December 25, 1862 – November 30, 1944), of Boston, Massachusetts, was a noted philatelic editor and writer.

Philatelic literature
In 1898 Wylie joined the Mekeel's Weekly Stamp News company and, in 1903, was named editor of the Weekly Philatelic Era, which was, by that time, owned and merged by Mekeel’s.

In 1913 the newly formed Severn-Wylie-Jewett Company, a partnership formed by Charles Esterly Severn, W. W. Jewett, and Wylie, purchased Mekeel's Weekly Stamp News and named Charles Severn its president and editor. Willard Wylie was assigned as vice president and managing editor. As part of his duties, Wylie was managing editor of Mekeel's Handbooks, each of which contained articles and monographs on important philatelic subjects. During his administration he was able to solicit and select material from important philatelic writers and published approximately fifty handbooks, the handbook series ending in 1930.

When Mekeel's Weekly Stamp News was moved from Boston, Massachusetts, to Portland, Maine, in 1940, Eveleen Mary Weldon Severn took over as editor and Wylie was named Editor Emeritus.

Honors and awards
Willard Wylie was named to the American Philatelic Society Hall of Fame in 1945.

See also
 1925–1926 Massachusetts legislature
 1927–1928 Massachusetts legislature
 Philately
 Philatelic literature

References
 Willard Otis Wylie  

1862 births
1944 deaths
Philatelic literature
American philatelists
Writers from Boston
American Philatelic Society